The Meadows is a historic property in Moorefield, West Virginia.

Description and history
The complex on the property includes a large brick farmhouse, two small barns and an outhouse. The property is associated with John Hanson McNeill a confederate soldier and irregular. Eleanor Roosevelt stayed there in 1941 and mentioned it in her newspaper column My Day. It was listed on the National Register of Historic Places on January 14, 1986, as part of the South Branch Valley Multiple Resource Area.

See also
 American Civil War
 Bushwhacker
 Historic preservation
 National Register of Historic Places in Hardy County, West Virginia

References

External links
 * 

Farms on the National Register of Historic Places in West Virginia
Houses on the National Register of Historic Places in West Virginia
Greek Revival houses in West Virginia
Houses completed in 1850
Houses in Hardy County, West Virginia
National Register of Historic Places in Hardy County, West Virginia
1850 establishments in Virginia